Kalva is a railway station on the Central Line of the Mumbai Suburban Railway. It is located in Kalwa. It is situated in between Thane railway station and Mumbra railway station

References

Mumbai CR railway division
Railway stations in Thane district
Mumbai Suburban Railway stations